South African variant can refer to several variants of SARS-CoV-2:

 SARS-CoV-2 Beta variant (B.1.351), first detected in the Eastern Cape province of South Africa in October 2020
 SARS-CoV-2 lineage C.1.2, first identified in May 2021 in South Africa
 SARS-CoV-2 Omicron variant (B.1.1.529), first reported to the WHO from South Africa in November 2021, though later found in older samples from Botswana

See also
 Variants of SARS-CoV-2